Camden Cats Senior Australian Football Club is an Australian rules football club based in the Sydney suburb of Harrington Park. The club colours are blue and white and they are nicknamed the Cats.

References

External links
 

Australian rules football clubs in Sydney
Australian rules football clubs established in 1982
1982 establishments in Australia